Banon may refer to:

 Banon cheese, French cheese
 Banon, Alpes-de-Haute-Provence, a commune in the Alpes-de-Haute-Provence department in France
 Characters of Final Fantasy VI#Banon, a character in Final Fantasy VI
 Tristane Banon, a French writer and journalist